Anacithara conata is a species of sea snail, a marine gastropod mollusc in the family Horaiclavidae.

Description
(Original description) The shell is shorter and broader than Anacithara naufraga (Hedley, 1909). Its color is pale brown with a chocolate peripheral band.

Distribution
This marine species is endemic to Australia and occurs off Queensland.

References

External links
  Hedley, C. 1922. A revision of the Australian Turridae. Records of the Australian Museum 13(6): 213–359, pls 42–56
  Tucker, J.K. 2004 Catalog of recent and fossil turrids (Mollusca: Gastropoda). Zootaxa 682:1–1295.

conata
Gastropods of Australia
Gastropods described in 1909